Helen Stewart may refer to:

 Helen Stewart (Bad Girls), a character on the British TV series Bad Girls
 Helen Stewart Hunt (born 1938), Canadian Olympic swimmer (formerly known as Helen Stewart)
 Helen J. Stewart (1854–1926), Southern Nevada pioneer, considered the "first lady of Las Vegas"
 Helen Stewart, wife of Jackie Stewart
 Helen Stewart (artist) (1900–1983), New Zealand painter
 Helen D'Arcy Stewart (1765–1838), Scottish poet and Edinburgh society hostess

See also
Helen Stuart, singer